The 2013 UEFA European Under-21 Championship qualification play-off ties were played over two legs, with the first legs scheduled on 11 and 12 October 2012 and the second legs on 15 and 16 October 2012. The seven winners qualified for the final tournament in Israel. Qualifying play-offs were the second stage of 2013 UEFA European Under-21 Championship qualification.

Seedings
The draw for the play-offs was held on 14 September 2012 in Nyon to determine the seven pairings as well as the order of the home and away ties. The seven group winners with the highest competition coefficients have been seeded and those teams were drawn against the unseeded teams. Nations from the same group could not be drawn against each other.

Each nation's coefficient was generated by calculating:
40% of the average ranking points per game earned in the 2013 UEFA European Under-21 Championship qualifying group stage.
40% of the average ranking points per game earned in the 2011 UEFA European Under-21 Championship qualifying stage and final tournament.
20% of the average ranking points per game earned in the 2009 UEFA European Under-21 Championship qualifying stage and final tournament.

The seedings were as follows:

Matches

|}

First leg

Second leg

Netherlands won 4–0 on aggregate.

Russia won 4–2 on aggregate.

Germany won 4–2 on aggregate.

Italy won 4–2 on aggregate.

England won 2–0 on aggregate.

Norway won 5–4 on aggregate.

Spain won 8–1 on aggregate.

References

External links
Official site

Play-offs
UEFA European Under-21 Championship qualification play-offs